Christine Sun Kim (born 1980) is an American sound artist based in Berlin. Working predominantly in drawing, performance, and video, Kim's practice considers how sound operates in society. Musical notation, written language, American Sign Language (ASL), and the use of the body are all recurring elements in her work. Her work has been exhibited in major cultural institutions internationally, including in the Museum of Modern Art's first exhibition about sound in 2013 and the Whitney Biennial in 2019. She was named a TED Fellow in both 2013 and 2015, a Director's Fellow at MIT Media Lab in 2015, and a Ford Foundation Disability Futures Fellow in 2020.

Background and education

Christine Sun Kim was born in 1980 and raised in Southern California with hearing parents and a deaf sister. Her first language is American Sign Language. She has been profoundly deaf since birth. She attended University High School in Irvine, California, and graduated from Rochester Institute of Technology in 2002 with a degree in Interdisciplinary Studies. She has a Master of Fine Arts in Visual Art from the School of Visual Arts in New York, and another in Sound and Music from Bard College.

Art style 
Kim investigates the operations of sound and various aspects of Deaf culture in her performances, videos, and drawings. In developing her personal visual language, Kim draws from a variety of information systems. She uses elements from these systems such as body language, American Sign Language (ASL), musical and graphic notation, and language interpretation, inventing new structures for her compositions and extending each source's scope of communication. She further uses sound to explore her own relationship to verbal languages and her environment. Through her work, she gains control of voice and sound, seeking to release them from social conventions.

Notable performances 
In 2015, she presented a TED Talk at a TED fellows retreat focusing on her relationship to sound, and how she has come to discover similarities between American Sign Language and music. She discussed how she felt that sound does not have to be solely experienced through auditory means.

In 2020, she performed at Super Bowl LIV, in what has become an annual partnership between the National Football League (NFL) and the National Association of the Deaf (NAD). She later penned an op-ed in The New York Times criticizing Fox Sports for cutting away during her American Sign Language performances of "America the Beautiful" and the national anthem.

Artworks

Close Readings 
Christine Sun Kim first experimented working with video in 2015 with her work Close Readings. Kim had four of her deaf friends recreate scenes from The Addams Family, Ghost, and The Little Mermaid by reading only the subtitles. The work reverses the traditional power dynamic between auditory media and Deaf audience by obscuring the upper half of the image, forcing a hearing audience to instead rely on the Deaf provided captions.

The Sound of 
Kim uses sound to explore her feelings in a unique way, as writer Molly Hannon addresses.  Kim's series of drawing, "The Sound of," was exhibited at Rubin Museum of Art. "It all goes back to my experience watching the film, Kumiko, The Treasure Hunter." said Kim. Even though there was not much dialogue, she was fascinated by how detailed and descriptive the captions of the movie were. She started to wonder if she was able to portray the sound of intangible objects like emotions or senses. This has become the essential reason she created this series. She takes traditional music dynamics and refashions them into music notes. In one of her drawings, The Sound of Obsessing, Kim uses the symbol "p" to represent the sound of piano and indicate the note is played quietly. As more "p" appears, the notes are played more quietly. Kim concretizes abstract ideas. She believes that obsession has a repetitive pattern and can take up a person's mind. She illustrates this pattern with the "p"s. "As time goes on, the obsession quickens, represented by the shrinking distance of p's. Finally, at the end, the p's are crowded and your mind is racing non-stop. You become totally engrossed with your obsession."

Degrees of Deaf Rage 
In 2018, Christine Sun Kim created a collection of six charcoal drawings on paper that explore "navigating the hearing world as a deaf person" shown in her series titled Degrees of Deaf Rage. The drawings depict various degrees of angles (acute rage, legit rage, obtuse rage, straight up rage, reflex rage, full on rage), each labeled with rage-inducing experiences Kim experiences as a Deaf person. She states, "Deaf rage is a real thing. In the Deaf community, it's something we know so well because we've all gone through it." She hopes to "communicate to a wider audience who are not deaf" and are unfamiliar with her culture, as Deaf people are a cultural entity and not just a group of isolated people who have impaired hearing. Kim uses familiar and relatable formats in Degrees of Deaf Rage so that her "deaf ideas" are easily understandable and accessible to hearing individuals as she explains, "It's like mathematical angles. How much rage do I have? You can see it in that size of the angle".

Solo exhibitions, performances and projects 
 Calibration Room and Bounce House, University of Texas at Austin Visual Arts Center, March–April 2015.
 Nap Disturbance, performance, Frieze London, October 6–9, 2016. Organized by Carroll/Fletcher.
 Face Value, workshop, Tate Modern, London, October 13–14, 2016.
 (LISTEN), A sound walk by Christine Sun Kim, organized by Avant.org, New York City, October 29–30, 2016.
 Lautplan, Kammer Klang, Cafe Oto, London, UK, 2017
 Busy Days, De Appel Arts Centre, Amsterdam, NL, 2017
  Sound Diet and Lullabies for Roux, White Space Beijing booth, Art Basel, CH, 2018
 Too Much Future, Public Art Installation, Whitney Museum, NY, USA, 2018
 With a Capital D, White Space, Beijing, CN, 2018-19
 Finish Forever, Ghebaly Gallery, Los Angeles, USA, 2018-19
 ‘To Point a Naked Finger': Christine Sun Kim & Thomas Mader, Albright-Knox Art Gallery, Jan. 26–Apr. 21, 2019
 Music Box + Smithsonian APA, New Orleans, LA, USA, 2019
 Spoken on My Behalf, Brown Arts Initiative, Brown University, Providence, RI, USA, 2019

Group exhibitions 

 Sounds Like Her, New Art Exchange, Nottingham, UK, 2017
 The World is Sound, Rubin Museum, New York, NY, USA, 2017
 Soundtracks, SF Museum of Modern Art, CA, USA, 2017
Resonant Spaces, Hood Museum, Dartmouth College, NH, USA, 2017
 Serralves Collection: New Lines, Images, Objects, Serralves Museum, Porto, PT, 2018
 For the Record, ifa gallery, Berlin, DE
 Paulo Cunha e Silva Art Prize, Galeria Municipal do Porto, Porto, PT, 2018
 What We Make, Ross Art Museum, Delaware, OH, USA, 2018
 50 State Initiative, For Freedoms, Jefferson City, MO and Des Moines, IA, USA, 2018
 Louder Than Words, Zuckerman Museum of Art, Kennesaw, GA, USA, 2019
 Whitney Biennial 2019, Whitney Museum, NY, USA, 2019
 Resonance: A Sound Art Marathon, Walker Art Center, Minneapolis, MN, USA

References

External links
 
 "The enchanting music of sign language" talk given at TED Fellows Retreat 2015

Living people
Deaf artists
American sound artists
Rochester Institute of Technology alumni
School of Visual Arts alumni
Bard College alumni
American deaf people
Artists from California
1980 births
Women sound artists
People from Orange County, California
21st-century American artists
21st-century American women artists
American artists of Korean descent